Dan Larsson (born 14 August 1958) is a Swedish former swimmer. He participated in the 1976 Summer Olympics, competing in freestyle and relay events. He finished 23rd in the 100 m freestyle and 11th in the 4×100 m medley relay.

Clubs
Sundsvalls SS

References

1958 births
Living people
Swimmers at the 1976 Summer Olympics
Olympic swimmers of Sweden
Swedish male freestyle swimmers
World Aquatics Championships medalists in swimming